Katrina Jayne Rivera Dimaranan (born June 3, 1993) is a Filipino-American model, actress, television personality, and beauty pageant titleholder who was appointed as Miss Supranational USA 2018. She represented the United States at the Miss Supranational 2018 pageant and finished 1st Runner-Up along with the Best Body Figure award. She was previously crowned Binibining Pilipinas Tourism 2012 at the Binibining Pilipinas 2012 pageant.

Early life
Dimaranan was born in San Juan, Metro Manila, Philippines to Filipino parents. She worked as an actress and a television host in a Filipino channel in the United States.

Pageantry

Binibining Pilipinas 2012
Dimaranan was 18 years old when she joined the Binibining Pilipinas 2012 pageant. She was crowned Binibining Pilipinas Tourism 2012 alongside the Best in Talent award.

Miss Tourism Queen International 2012
As the winner of the Binibining Pilipinas Tourism 2012 title, Dimaranan gained the right to represent the Philippines at the Miss Tourism Queen International 2012 pageant. The pageant was set for December 11 to 29, 2012 in China but was cancelled for undisclosed reasons.

Miss Supranational USA 2018
Dimaranan was appointed as Miss Supranational USA 2018 gaining the right to represent the United States at the Miss Supranational 2018 pageant.

Miss Supranational 2018
Dimaranan represented the United States at the Miss Supranational 2018 pageant. She finished as 1st Runner-Up along with the Best Body Figure award.

Miss Universe Philippines 2021
Representing Taguig, Dimaranan was one of the Top 30 delegates that competed for the Miss Universe Philippines 2021 crown on September 30, 2021 in Bohol wherein she finished as Miss Universe Philippines Tourism.

Filmography

Film

Television

References

External links

1993 births
Living people
Miss Supranational contestants
Filipino female models
Binibining Pilipinas winners
Miss Universe Philippines winners
Female models from California
People from Union City, California
People from San Juan, Metro Manila
People from Taguig
Filipino television actresses
Filipino television personalities
Filipino television talk show hosts
Filipino expatriates in the United States
American people of Filipino descent